The 2008 Tour de Corse was the thirteenth round of the 2008 World Rally Championship season. The event was won by Citroën driver Sébastien Loeb for the fourth year in succession. It was his tenth victory of the season and gave him a fourteen-point lead in the drivers table with just two rallies left in the season. Ford driver Mikko Hirvonen finished in second place after team orders issued by the Ford team forced François Duval and Jari-Matti Latvala to drop behind him, in order to improve his championship hopes.

Results

Special Stages
All dates and times are CEST (UTC+2).

Championship standings after the event

Drivers' championship

Manufacturers' championship

Junior championship

References

External links

 Results from the official site wrc.com
 Results at eWRC.com

Corse, Tour de
2008
Corse, Tour de
Corse, Tour de